Miguel Murillo may refer to:
Miguel Murillo (Bolivian footballer) (1898–1968), Bolivian football goalkeeper
Miguel Murillo (footballer, born 1988), Colombian football striker
Miguel Murillo (footballer, born 1993), Colombian football forward for Rionegro Águilas
Miguel Murillo (judoka) (born 1993), Costa Rican judoka